The Maktar and Mididi inscriptions are a number of Punic language inscriptions, found in the 1890s at Maktar and Mididi, Tunisia. A number of the most notable inscriptions have been collected in Kanaanäische und Aramäische Inschriften, and are known as are known as KAI 145-158.

More than 150 such inscriptions were known by the end of the 19th century.

Temple of Hathor Miskar

A number of inscriptions were found in 1892 during excavation of the Temple of Hathor Miskar. 

Ain Bab

In 1901 Paul Gauckler sent to the Comité des travaux historiques et scientifiques stampings of 6 monuments found in Maktar, from the Punico-Roman cemetery next to the Aïn-el-Bab gate. These are known as KAI 148-153 and RES 161-166.

Mididi
In 1901, René Basset sent to the Comité des travaux historiques et scientifiques stampings of 18 monuments and inscriptions found in the excavation of Mididi, of which 14 were neo-punic funerary inscriptions. These are known as KAI 154-158 and RES 167-180.

Bibliography

Temple of Hathor Miskar inscriptions
 Text-book of North-Semitic Inscriptions, Maktar, 59 A,B,C; p.150-157

Ain Bab and Mididi
 RES
 Les inscriptions de Maktar, 24 janvier 1890, Philippe Berger, Comptes rendus des séances de l'Académie des Inscriptions et Belles-Lettres  Année 1890  34-1  pp. 35-42
 Bulletin archéologique du Comité des travaux historiques et scientifiques

References

Archaeological artifacts
KAI inscriptions
Punic inscriptions